The 2008 Toulon Tournament was the 36th edition of the Toulon Tournament, and was held from 20 May to 29 May 2008. Tournament finished with the final between Italy and Chile at Stade Mayol in Toulon as Italy had the title after the final score of 1–0, scored by Pablo Osvaldo in the 70th minute.

Participant teams

 (host)
 (Olympic team)

Venues
The matches were held in these communes:
Aubagne
Hyères
La Londe
La Seyne
Saint-Cyr-sur-Mer
Solliès-Pont
Toulon

Squads

Results

Group A

Table

Match summaries
All times local (UTC+2)

Group B

Table

Match summaries
All times local (UTC+2)

Semi-finals

Third-place playoff

Final

Goal scorers
4 goals
 Sekou Cissé
2 goals

 José Pedro Fuenzalida
 Pedro Morales Flores
 Fabián Orellana
 Constant Djapka
 Julien Quercia
 Sebastian Giovinco

1 goal

 Carlos Carmona
 Juan Gonzalo Lorca
 Hans Martínez
 Boris Sagredo
 Beko Ismael Fofana
 Anthony Moura
 Alexandre Bonnet
 Xavier Pentecôte
 Pablo Osvaldo
 Ignazio Abate
 Daniele Dessena
 Davide Lanzafame
 Claudio Marchisio
 Sergio Escudero
 Tadanari Lee
 Takayuki Morimoto
 Masato Morishige
 Tsukasa Umesaki
 Dominique Kivuvu
 Eren Güngör
 İlhan Parlak
 Nuri Şahin
 Aydın Yılmaz
 Eric Brunner
 Sammy Ochoa

Own goal
 Cyriaque Louvion (for  Chile)

Individual awards
Player of the tournament:
 Sebastian Giovinco
The Best goalkeeper:
 Davide Bassi

Referees
Selected referees according to official website:

Referees:
 Steven Depiero
 Monetchet Nahi
 Olivier Thual
 Paolo Tagliavento
 Kenji Ogiya
 Jorg Sousa
 Iain Brines
 Fırat Aydınus

Assistant Referees:
 Daniel Belleau
 Darren Clark
 Karl Santigli
 Massimiliano Grilli
 Renato Faverani
 Jose Ramalho
 Francis Andrews
 Stuart Macaulay

References

External links
Schedule

 
2008
2007–08 in French football
2008 in youth association football
May 2008 sports events in France